Carle is given name that is a variant of Carla. Notable people with this name include the following:

Given name
Carle Bernier-Genest (fl. 2006 – 2009) is a Canadian politician
Carle Brenneman (born 1989), Canadian snowboarder,
Carle Hessay, birthname Hans Karl Hesse, (1911 -1978), German-born Canadian painter
Carle Pace (1918 – 2008), South African cyclist, track sprinter and endurance athlete
Carle M. Pieters (born 1943), American planetary scientist
Carle van Loo, alternate name of Charles-André van Loo (1705 – 1765), French painter
Carle Vernet, nickname of Antoine Charles Horace Vernet (1758 – 1836), was a French painter
Carle Augustus Woodruff (1841 – 1913), American soldier
Carle C. Zimmerman (1897 - 1983), American sociologist

Middle name
Thornton Carle Fry (1892 – 1991), applied mathematician

See also

Cable (surname)
Caple
Carl (name)
Carley (name)
Carle, surnames
Carle (disambiguation)
Carlee
Carlen (surname)
Carles (name)
Carley (name)
Carli (given name)
Carli (surname)
Carlie
Carlo (name)
Carlye J. Hughes
Carme (given name)
Carré (surname)
Carse (surname)
Charle (name)
De Carle